The following highways are numbered 393:

Brazil
 BR-393

Canada
Manitoba Provincial Road 393
 Quebec Route 393

Japan
 Japan National Route 393

United States
  Interstate 393
  Arkansas Highway 393
  Kentucky Route 393
  Maryland Route 393
 Maryland Route 393 (former)
  New York State Route 393 (former)
  Puerto Rico Highway 393
  South Carolina Highway 393 (former)
  Virginia State Route 393